Seán Jennett (12 November 1912 – 1981), now known as an author of many travel books, was a typographer for Faber and Faber, who published his The Making of Books (1951). He is also a published poet (then as Sean Jennet). He is from Yorkshire, of Irish extraction.

He translated Journal of a Younger Brother: The Life of Thomas Platter (1964), and was co-author with Sam McGredy of  A family of roses (1971).

External links

1912 births
1981 deaths
English travel writers
English typographers and type designers
English people of Irish descent
Writers from Yorkshire
20th-century English poets